Version may refer to:

Computing
 Software version, a set of numbers that identify a unique evolution of a computer program
 VERSION (CONFIG.SYS directive), a configuration directive in FreeDOS

Music
 Cover version
 Dub version
 Remix
 Version (album), a 2007 album by Mark Ronson
 Versions (Poison the Well album), 2007
 Versions (Thievery Corporation album), 2006
 Versions (MYMP album), 2005
 Versions (Robby Krieger album), 1982
 Versions (Zola Jesus album), 2013

Other
 Version (eye)
 External cephalic version
 Versions of the Bible
 Version (probability theory), a modification of a stochastic process

See also
 Bible version debate
 Version control, a component of software configuration management